Susan John may refer to:

 Susan V. John (1957–2021), American politician
 Sue John (born 1953), aka Dame Susan John, British headteacher